Stockholm Academic Forum, or "Staf", is a Swedish organisation representing 18 Stockholm universities, university colleges and the City of Stockholm. Stockholm Academic Forum promotes Stockholm as an important academic centre, and is working together with its members and partners in various forms and projects for that purpose.

The members of Staf are:

 
 
 Ersta Sköndal Bräcke University College
 Karolinska Institute
 Konstfack – University College of Arts, Crafts and Design
 KTH Royal Institute of Technology
 Red Cross University College of Nursing
 Royal College of Music, Stockholm
 Royal Institute of Art
 Sophiahemmet University College
 Stockholm School of Economics
 Stockholm University
 Stockholm University College of Music Education
 Stockholm University of the Arts
 Swedish Defence University
 Swedish School of Sport and Health Sciences
 Södertörn University
 University College Stockholm

References

External links 
 Stockholm Academic Forum

Higher education in Stockholm
College and university associations and consortia in Europe